Volpago del Montello is a comune (municipality) in the Province of Treviso in the Italian region Veneto, located about  northwest of Venice and about  northwest of Treviso on the southern slopes of Montello.

History
The fall of the Republic of Venice was followed by an upheaval of the rural, political and religious systems replaced by municipalities. Volpago then passed with the whole of Veneto to the Kingdom of Lombardy–Venetia and was later united with the Kingdom of Italy.

In 1870, the town was one of the first to be industrialized, thanks to the activity of the Gobbato family. A spinning mill and a silk plant were added to the family's villas, which employed hundreds of people from neighboring villages as well. However, this did not help curb widespread poverty, which resulted in massive emigration abroad, especially to South America.

Near the Piave front, Volpago found itself on the front lines during World War I, which raged especially along the northern slope of Montello.

During World War II, Volpago saw many of its citizens fall in war, and many were also captured in the Nazi-fascist roundups.

Economy
The socio-economic development of the Volpago area was strongly characterized until the 1960s by large waves of emigration that gave those who remained the opportunity to receive remittances from fellow citizens abroad, essential for investing in businesses and contributing to the economic miracle that swept Italy after the war. The first emigrations to Central Europe and North America were soon replaced by numerous private small business initiatives that took the country out of rural reality. The number of family-run workshops that produced widespread prosperity was significant between the 1960s and 1980s. The processing of the related industries of large textile industries, sports shoes and canning activities constituted a very general source of employment and income. The socio-economic crisis of the early 1990s has reduced this organization which is no longer consistent with the different structures of the new economy. Currently, apart from some entrepreneurial initiatives, the population has found other sources of income that allow a fairly good standard of living. Though Volpago might have been known for its industrial settlements years ago, its attractions are currently quite different.

Twin towns
Volpago del Montello is twinned with:

  Bree, Belgium, since 1985
  Salomó, Spain, since 1994

References

External links

 

Cities and towns in Veneto